The Lebanese Association of Certified Public Accountants (LACPA), in the Republic of Lebanon, was created by the Accountancy Profession Act No. 364/1994  to become the sole organization in Lebanon representing more than 1711 members of the CPA profession as of May 2011. LACPA is an active member of (IFAC) International Federation of Accountants, (FIDEF) Federation Internationale des Experts-Comptables Francophone and (AFAA) Arab Federation for Accountants and Auditors  a federation of the Joint Arab Economic Action Charter of the Arab League.

Aims
LACPA and through its acting Committees formed by a Council of 10 professionals elected every 2 years, establishes national standards on ethics, auditing, accounting education and accounting practices. It also issues guidance to encourage high quality performance by professional accountants.

Personnel
LACPA Council is composed of 10 members headed by the chairman elected every 2 years. Council Chairpersons since 1994 were: Mouaffaq Yafi, George Abu Mansour, Farid Gebran, Hikmat Sleem, Antoine Gholam, Gebran Barghoud, Gina Chammas, Amin Saleh, Elie Abboud, Selim Abdel Baki & Sarkis Sakr.

LACPA administrative and technical body is headed by a Secretary General. Secretary generals since 1994: Claude Boustany, David Kazzi, Fares Aboujaoude & Nadine Aoun.

References

External links 
 LACPA website
 Lebanese Laws website
 FIDEF Active Members page/Lebanon
 IFAC
 AFAA Active Members page/Lebanon

Accounting in Lebanon